|}

The Athasi Stakes is a Group 3 flat horse race in Ireland open to thoroughbred fillies and mares aged three years or older. It is run over a distance of 7 furlongs (1,408 metres) at the Curragh in early May.

History
The event is named after Athasi, a successful broodmare in the 1920s and 1930s. Her progeny included Trigo, the winner of the Derby and St Leger in 1929.

The Athasi Stakes was formerly restricted to fillies aged three. Following a period with Group 3 status, it was downgraded to Listed level in 1987.

The race was opened to four-year-old fillies in 1993. It was opened to older mares in 2001. It regained Group 3 status in 2003.

Records

Most successful horse:
 no horse has won this race more than once

Leading jockey since 1986 (5 wins):
 Michael Kinane – Certain Secret (1988), Inishdalla (1991), Market Booster (1992), Asema (1993), Hazariya (2005)

Leading trainer since 1986 (7 wins):
 Dermot Weld – Certain Secret (1988), Inishdalla (1991), Market Booster (1992), Asema (1993), Cool Clarity (2001), Rum Charger (2002), Flying Jib (2014)

Winners since 1986

Earlier winners

 1952: Winged Foot
 1953: Banri an Oir
 1955: Dark Issue
 1956: Atlantida
 1957: After the Show
 1960: Gilboa
 1962: Lovely Gale
 1963: Evening Shoe
 1964: Royal Danseuse
 1965: Arctic Melody
 1966: Loyalty
 1967: Jadeite
 1968: Rimark
 1969: Wenduyne
 1970: Miralife
 1971: Leit Motif
 1972: Arkadina
 1973: Daria
 1974: Lisadell
 1975: Miralla
 1976: Serencia
 1977: Orchestration
 1978: Smelter
 1979: Godetia
 1980: Etoile de Paris
 1981: Martinova
 1982: Celestial Path
 1983: Flame of Tara
 1984: Reo Racine
 1985: Quiet Thoughts

See also
 Horse racing in Ireland
 List of Irish flat horse races

References

 Paris-Turf:
 Racing Post:

 galopp-sieger.de – Athasi Stakes.
 ifhaonline.org – International Federation of Horseracing Authorities – Athasi Stakes (2019).
 pedigreequery.com – Athasi Stakes – Curragh.

Mile category horse races for fillies and mares
Curragh Racecourse
Flat races in Ireland